Mansfield is a suburban city in the U.S. state of Texas, and is part of the Dallas–Fort Worth metroplex area. The city is located mostly in Tarrant County, with small parts in Ellis and Johnson counties. Its location is approximately 30 miles from Dallas and 20 miles from Fort Worth, and is adjacent to Arlington. As of the 2010 census, the population was 56,368, up from 28,031 in 2000. The estimated population in 2020 is 73,550.

History
The first wave of European settlers arrived in the rolling Cross Timbers country of north central Texas in the 1840s. Primarily of Scotch-Irish origins, these pioneer farmers came for the most part from southern states, following the frontier as it shifted west of the Mississippi. They entered an area where Native Americans had been living for thousands of years. The Comanche posed a serious threat to the settlers, and in 1849, the U.S. Army established Fort Worth to protect the farms along the sparsely populated frontier.

The area southeast of the fort (and of the Trinity River) was well protected and presumably fairly well settled by the early 1850s. In one well-documented case, eight related families migrated to the area in 1853 from Illinois. This settlement, which became known as the Gibson Community, included a school and a church building by 1860.

When Ralph Sandiford Mann and Julian Feild arrived around 1856 and built a grist mill at the crossroads that was to become the center of Mansfield, the beginnings of the community probably existed in the oak groves bordering Walnut Creek (originally called Cedar Bluff Creek). The Walnut Creek Congregation of the Cumberland Presbyterian Church had organized itself in 1854. Members met in each other's homes, so it is suspected that there was a cluster of houses in the area.

In 1856, Julian Feild purchased  in the Mansfield area. Man and Feild completed their three-story brick grist mill sometime between 1856 and 1859. The mill, which produced flour and meal, was the first built in North Texas to utilize steam power and enjoyed patronage as far south as San Antonio and as far north as Oklahoma. The location of the mill in southeastern Tarrant County perhaps reflects the advanced state of wheat cultivation in the area and the ready availability of wood to feed the mill's steam boilers.

Feild opened a general merchandise store at the same time as the mill, located across Broad Street. He built a log house for his family, which also served as an inn for travelers and customers. By 1860, the nucleus of the future city existed. The first post office was established that year, with Julian Feild as postmaster.

During the American Civil War, the Man and Feild Mill supplied meal and flour to the Confederate States Army, hauling it to Shreveport, Louisiana, and Jefferson City, Missouri. As was common practice, the owners tithed ten percent of the mill's production to the Confederacy. The small community around the mill was unique in Tarrant County in that it prospered throughout the Civil War. "Feild's Freighters", assembled in ox-drawn wagon trains, went as far as Fort Sill, Oklahoma, where a part of the Indian Wars raged in the southern plains in the late 1860s and 1870s.

The prospering community which had grown up around the Man and Feild mill took on the name of "Mansfeild", a combination of the names of the founders. Repeated misspellings over the years resulted in the acceptance of the conventional spelling of "Mansfield." The town incorporated in 1909, continuing to be a hub for the surrounding farmland.

In 1956, a federal court ordered the Mansfield Independent School District to desegregate; the first such order in Texas. Protests by 300 whites in front of Mansfield High School, to prevent three black students from enrolling, touched off one of the longest-running desegregation battles of the Civil Rights Movement. Mansfield's school quietly desegregated in 1965 as it faced a lack of federal funds.

Geography

Demographics

According to the 2020 United States census, there were 72,602 people, 22,760 households, and 18,066 families residing in the city. The racial and ethnic makeup as of 2020 was 49.04% non-Hispanic white, 21.4% African American, 0.35% Native American, 5.48% Asian, 0.07% Pacific Islander, 0.46% some other race, 4.72% multiracial, and 18.49% Hispanic or Latino of any race. The racial and ethnic composition of the population in 2010 was 64.4% non-Hispanic white, 14.2% black or African American, 0.6% Native American, 1.5% Vietnamese, 2.2% other Asian, 0.1% Pacific Islander, 0.2% non-Hispanic from some other race, 2.8% from two or more races and 15.4% Hispanic or Latino. 5,996 of the city's population are foreign-born.

Economy

According to information released by the city government, the largest employers of Mansfield as of 2021 were:

Arts and culture

Established in 1917, Farr Best Theater is the city's historical venue for concerts, musical revue and live performances. Even though ownership of the theater has changed hands many times since its inception, the Farr family still resides in Mansfield.

For softball and baseball tournaments, Big League Dreams has eight replica baseball fields and an indoor soccer pavilion.

The Mansfield Historical Museum chronicles the city's history from a prairie outpost in the past to a thriving community now.

Hawaiian Falls Water Park is a  destination during the hot summer months; while Historic Mansfield is being revitalized to be a year-round destination. Downtown hosts annual festivals such as the Hot Beats and Cold Brews Festival, the Hometown Holiday Parade and St. Patrick's Day Pickle Parade.

Mansfield has an extensive park system including 11 parks,  of hiking/biking trail, an  nature park, an activity center, and four athletics fields. Mansfield also has two renowned golf courses: Mansfield National Golf Course and Walnut Creek Country Club.

Education

The Mansfield Independent School District includes all portions of Mansfield in Tarrant and Johnson counties. The portion in Ellis County is zoned to the Midlothian Independent School District.

The high schools in the district are Mansfield High School, Mansfield Summit High School, Mansfield Timberview High School, Mansfield Legacy High School, Frontier High School , Mansfield Lake Ridge High School, Mansfield Early College High School, and the Alternative Education Center consisting of the ACE program and the BIC program. There are 24 elementary schools, seven intermediate schools, and seven middle school and the Jerry Knight STEM Academy (6-8th Grades). The district's athletic facilities are the Vernon Newsom Stadium and MISD Natatorium which make up the MISD Multi-Purpose Athletics Complex and the RL Anderson Football Stadium. The Center for Performing Arts consists of two venues: the 5,500-seat Claude H. Cunningham Performance Hall and the John Washington Professional Development Center.

Tarrant County residents are zoned to Tarrant County College (formerly Tarrant County Junior College). Portions in Ellis County are zoned to Navarro College. Portions in Johnson County are zoned to Hill College.

Mansfield school desegregation incident

Infrastructure

Highways
 Texas State Highway 360
 U.S. Route 287 in Texas

Healthcare

Mansfield has two acute-care hospitals: Methodist Mansfield Medical Center, a 262-bed hospital of the Methodist Health System in Dallas; and Texas Health Mansfield, an 59-bed hospital that is a joint venture between Texas Health Resources and AdventHealth. Mansfield also has five nursing homes, several urgent care centers, Kindred Hospital—an acute care rehab hospital, Baylor Surgicare at Mansfield—a day surgery center, three assisted living/senior apartments,  two Cook Children's clinics and a Cook Children's Specialty Care Facility under construction.

Twin towns and sister cities
  – Mansfield, Nottinghamshire, England

Notable people

 Brandon Bantz, baseball player
 Burley Bearden (1917–1997), football coach
 Tex Bradford (1899–1975), football player and medical doctor
 Kennedy Brooks, football player
 John Chiles, football player
 David Cook, Republican member of the Texas House of Representatives and former mayor of Mansfield
 Marcus Cromartie, football player
 Josh Doctson, football player
 Troy Dorsey, boxer
 John Howard Griffin (1920–1980), civil rights activist, author of the award-winning book Black Like Me
 Mickey Guyton, country singer
 Chris Harris, politician and attorney
 Sam Hilliard, baseball player
 Adrianne Jones, murder victim
 David Mann, actor and singer
 Tamela Mann, actress and singer
 Gil Meche, baseball player
 Drake Milligan, country singer
 Tevin Mitchel, professional gridiron football player
 Ella Mae Morse, pop singer
 Rees Odhiambo, football player
 Lenzy Pipkins, football player
 Hassan Ridgeway, football player
 Dan Rodimer, wrestler
 Quinn Sharp, football player
 John Hall Stephens (1847–1924), U.S. Congressman of Texas
 Noah Syndergaard, professional baseball player
 Stepfan Taylor, football player
 Jordan Walden, baseball player
 Andrew Wamsley, convicted murderer

References

External links

 
Cities in Texas
Cities in the Dallas–Fort Worth metroplex
Cities in Ellis County, Texas
Cities in Johnson County, Texas
Cities in Tarrant County, Texas
Populated places established in 1856